Albanites is a genus of extinct cephalopods belonging to the ammonoid order Ceratitida that lived during the Early Triassic.

The shell of Albanites is more or less involute, smooth or faintly ribbed. Sides are flattened; the venter, which is the outer rim, is broadly rounded. Sutures are ceratitic with jagged lobes and rounded saddles.

Albanites is included in the Meekoceratidae although Arkell, et al. (1957) included it in the Noritidae in the Treatise Part L, 1957.

References 

 Arkell, et al., 1957. Mesozoic Ammonoidea. Treatise on Invertebrate Paleontology, Part L. Geological Soc. of America and University of Kansas Press.
 Albanites-Paleodb 10/8/11

Noritidae
Ceratitida genera
Early Triassic ammonites
Triassic animals of Asia